This is a list of television programs formerly broadcast by the defunct Canadian television channel Cosmopolitan TV.

Final programming
This was a list of programs being broadcast regularly.

Current

A-E
 Baggage
 Charmed
 Cougar Town
 Excused

F-J
 Ghost Whisperer
 Just Married

K-O
 Love Trap
 Oh So Cosmo

P-T
 Rules of Engagement
 Sex and the City
 Sophie
 Style By Jury
 StyleOgraphy

U-Z
 The Vampire Diaries

Former programming

A-E
 Abbey & Janice: Beauty and the Best
 The Agency
 All on the Line
 American Princess
 Anna and Kristina's Beauty Call
 The Bachelor
 The Bachelor Pad
 The Bachelorette
 Bachelorette Party
 Beach Girls
 Beautiful People
 Between The Sheets
 Cashmere Mafia
 Charlotte & Jordan: Runway to LA
 The Class
 Cold Case
 Dawson's Creek
 Dirty Cows
 Double Exposure
 Extreme Celebrities

F-J
 Fashion File
 Felicity
 Gilmore Girls
 Hollywood's 10 Best
 Jerseylicious

K-O
 Kell on Earth
 Ladette to Lady
 Love Broker
 Love, Inc.
 Manhattan Matchmaker
 Men in Trees
 Miss Match
 A Model Life
 Models NYC
 The Opposite of Sex

P-Z
 Rags to Red Carpet
 Samantha Who?
 Sex Tips for Girls
 Single Girl Diaries
 Single in South Beach
 The Smart Woman Survival Guide
 Tough Love Miami
 The Truth About the Sexes
 Veronica Mars
 A View From The Top

External links
 Cosmopolitan TV website

Cosmopolitan TV (Canada)